Dynasty Warriors Next is a hack and slash video game and a spin-off title of the Dynasty Warriors series of video games. Developed by Omega Force and published by Koei, it was released for the PlayStation Vita. Similar to the other games in the franchise, the game's plot follows that of the book Romance of the Three Kingdoms by Luo Guanzhong. The game was developed as a Vita launch title, and was released along with the console in all regions.

Gameplay
Dynasty Warriors Next is split into several scenarios where all stages are chosen from a map of China. The territories can be invaded in order to gain influence and gold for each owned region. The earned gold can be spent on stratagems, which are special boosts represented by the officers of a player's faction. They come with different bonuses: increasing attack and defense, boosting the aggression of the enemy's army, making the bases easier to seize, and others. The army can be equipped with items and weapons that are found on the battlefield, like buffs, enhancements or horses.

Once the battle starts, the map gets split between allied and enemy bases. Each of them have a special purpose, and benefit the side which controls it. A supply will increase the power of all owned bases, and an armory can temporarily double the troops' attack. The lairs can spawn animal reinforcements in bears, tigers or wolves, while the magical bases link themselves to other bases, making them invulnerable. The bases can be captured by killing everything that is inside, until the counter drops to zero. At any point, an unskippable one-on-one duel may initiate. Similar to Infinity Blade, the player can block the attacks while tapping the flashing points to break their resistance, and finish them off.

There are several game modes available. Campaign contains three story acts and is loosely based on Romance of the Three Kingdoms, with the purpose of introducing the basic concepts. It serves as a series of battles, where the rival kingdoms are vying for control of the land. The player usually gets to make a choice of which officer to take in, except for key conflicts where it's all restricted. In the Conquest mode, the main goal of taking over territories across China remains the same, only that it also allows the players to create their own army and officers. Edit Mode is used for creating or editing characters. The customization materials are unlocked by completing the Campaign parts, and every created character can be brought in Conquest afterwards. Conquest has an online version, where the game will collect data from other players to populate the battlefield. The player will then face off against other Edit Mode creations, in addition to the regular cast.

The game makes use of touch and gyroscope Vita controls: tilting for aiming Musou attacks or marking enemies' weak points, and touchscreen for blocking and deflecting projectiles.

Reception

Dynasty Warriors Next was met with average to mixed reception upon release; GameRankings gave it a score of 68.31%, while Metacritic gave it 67 out of 100.

Notes

References

External links
 Official website of North America

Dynasty Warriors
PlayStation Vita games
PlayStation Vita-only games
Koei games
2011 video games
Video games developed in Japan
Video games set in China